Emmelshausen is a former Verbandsgemeinde ("collective municipality") in the Rhein-Hunsrück district, in Rhineland-Palatinate, Germany. Its seat was in Emmelshausen. On 1 January 2020 it was merged into the new Verbandsgemeinde Hunsrück-Mittelrhein.

The Verbandsgemeinde Emmelshausen consisted of the following Ortsgemeinden ("local municipalities"):

Former Verbandsgemeinden in Rhineland-Palatinate